Hester Biosciences Limited (HBL) is a publicly traded Indian company headquartered in Ahmedabad, Gujarat, India.  Hester is an animal and poultry vaccines manufacturing company with plants situated in Gujarat and Nepal. The company currently has a 30% share of the poultry vaccines market in the country. This makes Hester India's second largest poultry vaccine manufacturer. Hester is also the first commercial manufacturer of Goat pox vaccine in India and manufactures PPR vaccines from both, Nigerian and Sungri strains.

Finances 
Hester equity shares are listed on the National Stock Exchange of India (NSE) as HESTERBIO and on the BSE (Security Code: 524669). They are also the owners of subsidiaries including Hester Biosciences Africa, and have acquired other company’s like Gujarat Agrofarm (which they purchased in 2007).  
As on 31 March 2019, market capitalisation of the company stood at Rs. 13.1 billion. The CEO and founder of the company is Rajiv Gandhi.
For the Q1FY20 ended June 2019, Hester Biosciences registers 11% sales growth in Q1FY20; Nepal unit registers 64% revenue growth, construction of Africa unit underway.

Operations 
Hester creates products including vaccines, drugs, feed supplements and disinfectants. They have a line of 45 poultry vaccines (live and inactivated), 4 large animal vaccines (live and inactivated), health products and diagnostics. Hester also provides seromonitoring for poultry farms and mastitis prevention programmers for cattle farms. The company owns and operates Asia's largest single-location animal biological manufacturing facility. Hester Biosciences also has an R&D unit at Kadi, and develops new animal vaccines, an example of which is the Goat Pox vaccine Live-Uttarkashi strain used in India. They have also partnered with Galvmed on vaccines for Newcastle disease.

The Company is planning to increase its exports to the African region following good market potential and the need for animal vaccines in that region. Hester expects export revenues from Africa to increase to about 70 percent in the coming years from 40-45 percent currently. In the first nine months of the current fiscal, Hester's overall exports stood at Rs 12 crore, with Africa's share at 40-45 percent. Hester targets African market for poultry, animal healthcare products

Recognition 
In 2010 Hester Biosciences received "The Best Animal Vaccine Company" honor from The New Economy in the UK.

See also
 Brucellosis Vaccine
 Goat Pox Vaccine
 Poultry disease
 FAO

References

Manufacturing companies based in Ahmedabad
Pharmaceutical companies of India
1983 establishments in Gujarat
Indian companies established in 1983
Pharmaceutical companies established in 1983